Suicidal Tendencies is an American crossover thrash band from Venice, California. Formed in 1980, the group originally featured vocalist Mike Muir, guitarist Mike Ball, bassist Mike Dunnigan, and drummer Carlos "Egie" Egert. Muir is the band's only constant member, the current lineup of which features lead guitarist Dean Pleasants (since 1996), bassist Roberto "Ra" Díaz, drummer Dave Lombardo (both since 2016), and rhythm guitarist Ben Weinman (since 2018).

History

1980–1995
Mike Muir formed Suicidal Tendencies in 1980 with Mike Ball, Mike Dunnigan and Carlos Egert, the latter of whom left after the band's first demo recording and was replaced by Dunnigan's brother, Sean. By 1982, Mike Dunnigan had switched to guitar and Louiche Mayorga had taken over on bass. This lineup recorded "I Saw Your Mommy" for the 1983 Mystic Records compilation Slamulation, after which the Dunnigan brothers left. They were replaced by drummer Amery "AWOL" Smith and guitarist Rick Battson, briefly, before Grant Estes took over from the latter. After the recording of their self-titled full-length debut, Jon Nelson briefly joined as a second guitarist, before Estes quit just before the start of a tour in the summer and Nelson took over lead guitar.

In the summer of 1984, Leonard "Rocky" George took over on guitar; shortly thereafter, Smith was also replaced by Ralph "R. J." Herrera. The band contributed "Look Up... (The Boys Are Back)" to their own label Suicidal's Welcome to Venice compilation in 1985, and released Join the Army in 1987. After the album's promotional touring cycle, Muir brought in rhythm guitarist Mike Clark from recently disbanded No Mercy (of which he was also a member), while Mayorga was replaced by Bob Heathcote from Los Cycos, another of Muir's side projects. After the release and promotion of How Will I Laugh Tomorrow When I Can't Even Smile Today, Heathcote left in February 1989 due to musical differences. Bass on Controlled by Hatred/Feel Like Shit... Déjà Vu was performed by George and Clark.

By the time of a European tour supporting Anthrax in the summer of 1989, Robert Trujillo had taken over bass for Suicidal Tendencies. The new lineup released Lights... Camera... Revolution! in 1990, before Herrera left in late 1991 due to tensions with Muir and his wife being pregnant with their first child. For their next album The Art of Rebellion, the group enlisted Vandals drummer Josh Freese on a session basis. After the album was released, Jimmy DeGrasso took over on drums. In 1993, the band released Still Cyco After All These Years, which featured new versions of songs from their self-titled debut recorded in 1990. The first new album with DeGrasso, Suicidal for Life, followed in June 1994. By late 1995, however, Muir had disbanded Suicidal Tendencies.

1996–present
After "about a year" away, Suicidal Tendencies reformed with a new lineup including Infectious Grooves members Dean Pleasants on lead guitar, Josh Paul on bass and Brooks Wackerman on drums, who joined returning members Mike Muir and Mike Clark. This incarnation remained stable for several years, releasing Freedumb, Free Your Soul and Save My Mind, and tracks on several compilations. In early 2001, Wackerman left to pursue other projects and was replaced by Ron Bruner. Around a year later, Paul also left the band, with Bruner's brother Steve "Thundercat" Bruner taking his place. Also in 2002, David Hidalgo Jr. began sharing drum duties with Bruner, with both members performing at various points over the coming years. In October 2008, Eric Moore took over as the band's full-time drummer.

In 2011, Thundercat left Suicidal Tendencies to focus on his solo career. He was replaced by Tim "Rawbiz" Williams. The following June, longtime rhythm guitarist Mike Clark also left to reform No Mercy under the new name Waking the Dead. He was replaced by Nico Santora, who completed work on the band's next studio album 13. Shortly after its release, in March 2014 it was announced that former Mars Volta drummer Thomas Pridgen had replaced Moore. In August that year, the band announced that bassist Williams had died. The following month, Pridgen left after just six months with the group to join Chiodos, with Moore returning in his place. Michael Morgan temporarily took over as the band's bassist when they resumed touring in the fall of 2014.

In February 2016, Suicidal Tendencies underwent two more lineup changes – Roberto "Ra" Díaz took over on bass, while former Slayer drummer Dave Lombardo replaced Moore. In May, Santora was replaced by Jeff Pogan, who debuted on World Gone Mad later that year. After the EP Get Your Fight On! and another album, Still Cyco Punk After All These Years, Pogan left and was replaced by former Dillinger Escape Plan guitarist Ben Weinman.

Members

Current

Former

Timeline

Lineups

References

Suicidal Tendencies